John William Rennicke (August 11, 1929 – December 9, 2007) was an American professional basketball player. 
He grew up in Aurora, Illinois, and played basketball for East Aurora High School, where he was later inducted into the Athletic Hall of Fame. 
After a successful collegiate career with Drake, Rennicke was selected in the sixth round 1951 NBA Draft by the Tri-Cities Blackhawks.
He played for the Milwaukee Hawks in only six games during the second half of the 1951–52 season. He also played for the Elmira Colonels in the American Basketball League in 1951–52 before retiring from professional basketball. Rennicke also played minor league baseball in the Chicago Cubs organization.
Rennicke died in Minnesota in 2007.

References

External links
John Rennicke's obituary

1929 births
2007 deaths
American Basketball League (1925–1955) players
American men's basketball players
Baseball players from Illinois
Basketball players from Illinois
Drake Bulldogs men's basketball players
Guards (basketball)
Milwaukee Hawks players
Sportspeople from Aurora, Illinois
Sioux Falls Canaries players
Topeka Owls players
Tri-Cities Blackhawks draft picks